Bamonte’s is a family owned Italian restaurant at 32 Withers Street in Williamsburg, Brooklyn, New York.  Anthony Bamonte began running it in the 1960s, eventually bringing in daughter Nicole.

It is said to have been a Mob hangout. In 2009, after he was released from a federal penitentiary, Anthony "Fat Tony" Rabito of the Bonanno crime family, was forbidden by his probation officer from returning to several Italian restaurants in Brooklyn, Queens and Manhattan, including Bamonte's.  After Carmine Galante was murdered, they “closed down for a night and the heads of the five crime families held a celebratory dinner.”

History
When Anthony’s grandfather, Pasquale Bamonte, and his wife settled in Williamsburg after immigrating from Salerno, Italy they opened Liberty Hall in 1900, which became Bamonte’s.  It originally served as a banquet hall and meeting place.

Honors and awards
In 2021, Bamonte’s was named on of NYC’s 21 best Italian restaurants by Condé Nast Traveler.

In popular culture
Bamonte's was featured in Season 5 of Starz T.V. show Power as a mob hangout. It's where Vincent Ragni held his meetings.
It was a setting for several episodes of The Sopranos. Character Gerry Torciano was murdered there.
Episodes of Person of Interest and Kojak also filmed here
An episode in Season 6 of Homeland was filmed here
 1989 mobster film Cookie
Blue Bloods Season 11, Episode 14 The New You

References

Restaurants in Brooklyn
Williamsburg, Brooklyn
Italian restaurants in New York City
Restaurants established in 1900
Italian-American organized crime